J. P. Jayasena (1921-1990) was a Ceylonese Senator. He was educated at the Kingswood College, Kandy. where he passed his Metriculation Examination.

References

Members of the Senate of Ceylon
Alumni of Kingswood College, Kandy
1921 births
1990 deaths